Cornwall with Caroline Quentin is a British documentary series about Cornwall, presented by Caroline Quentin. The first series comprised 8 episodes and was broadcast on ITV from 2 January to 20 February 2012. The second series comprised 10 episodes and was broadcast from 7 January to 11 March 2013. Episodes are shown on Monday evenings at 8pm.

Transmissions

Episode list

Series 1

Series 2

References

External links 

2010s British documentary television series
2012 British television series debuts
2013 British television series endings
ITV documentaries
Television series by ITV Studios
English-language television shows
Television shows set in Cornwall